Vesenny (masculine), Vesennyaya (feminine), or Vesenneye (neuter) is the name of several inhabited localities in Russia.

Urban localities
Vesenny, Chukotka Autonomous Okrug, an urban-type settlement in Bilibinsky District of Chukotka Autonomous Okrug

Rural localities
Vesenny, Bryansk Oblast, a settlement in Krasnorogsky Selsoviet of Pochepsky District of Bryansk Oblast
Vesenny, Orenburg Oblast, a settlement in Vesenny Selsoviet of Orenburgsky District of Orenburg Oblast
Vesenny, Rostov Oblast, a settlement in Krasnovskoye Rural Settlement of Tarasovsky District of Rostov Oblast
Vesenneye, a selo in Vesennensky Selsoviet of Ust-Abakansky District of the Republic of Khakassia